Bonifacio Laqui Bosita is a Filipino motorcycle rights activist and retired police officer. He is currently serving as representative for the 1-Rider Partylist in the House of Representatives.

Police career
Bosita was a former police officer who was part of the Highway Patrol Group of the Philippine National Police (PNP). He was also Public Information Office Chief of the Cavite office of the PNP.

Riders' Safety Advocates of the Philippines
Bosita is the founder of the Riders' Safety Advocates of the Philippines (RSAP), a group for riders and motorists.

2021 slipper case
Bosita came into public attention in March 2021, when he was featured in a viral video where he disputes a Metropolitan Manila Development Authority (MMDA) traffic enforcer's action of filing a ticket against a couple driving in tandem on a motorcycle for breaking a shoes-only policy – while the driver was wearing shoes the backseat woman passenger was penalized for wearing slippers causing her to miss a day of work. Bosita believing that the policy should only apply to the driver made the enforcer pay a day's worth of the backseat passenger's salary (around ). This led to MMDA traffic czar Edison Bong Nebrija to respond alleging Bosita of exploiting traffic enforcers for political gain.

In February 2022, Bosita was arrested in Surigao del Sur in connection with the March 2021 incident after charges of grave coercion and usurpation of authority was filed against him by Nebrija. He posted bail on both charges.

Online presence
Bosita runs a YouTube channel as part of his work for RSAP under the name "Colonel Bosita, RSAP". Bosita received a silver play button in April 2021 since his channel already have 348 thousand subscribers at that time, way past the minimum of 100 thousand subscribers. He has also a following on Facebook having 800 thousand followers as of May 2022.

Political career
Following the March 2021 incident, Bosita decided to enter politics initially planning to run for senator. His group partnered with Bicol-based motorcycle club 1-Rider which made a bid to get partylist representation in the Philippines House of Representatives. Bosita was named second nominee of the group, although he was significantly involved in 1-Rider's campaign often appearing in videos and other election paraphernalia. 1-Rider was able to garner enough votes to secure two seats which were filled in by Ramon Gutierrez and Bosita himself.

Reference

Filipino police officers
Filipino activists
Filipino YouTubers
Year of birth missing (living people)
Living people
Place of birth missing (living people)
Party-list members of the House of Representatives of the Philippines
21st-century Filipino politicians